The  4 × 2.5 kilometre mixed relay competition of the 2018 Winter Paralympics was held at the Alpensia Biathlon Centre in Pyeongchang. The competition took place on 18 March 2018.

Results

See also
Cross-country skiing at the 2018 Winter Olympics

References

4 x 2.5 kilometre open relay